The professional event in épée at the 1900 Summer Olympics had 54 fencers from 5 nations compete. The event took place from 11 to 14 June at the Tuileries Garden. The event was won by Albert Ayat of France, leading a French sweep with Gilbert Bougnol taking silver and Henri Laurent bronze.

Background

Fencing was the only sport that had professional competitions at the Olympics in 1900 and 1904. A professional foil event was held in 1900, with épée and sabre joining in 1904. The professional events were not held again afterwards (excepting the 1906 Intercalated Games, so this was the only time that masters épée was contested. The épée events also featured a unique competition: an amateurs-masters épée event. The top 4 fencers in this event, as well as the top 4 fencers in the amateurs épée event, were eligible for that competition.

Competition format

The event used a three-round format: quarterfinals, semifinals, and a final. Each round consisted of pool play. For the quarterfinals, the fencers were divided into 9 pools of 6 fencers each; the top two fencers in each pool advanced to the semifinals. The semifinals had the 18 men compete in 3 pools of 6, with the top 3 in each pool advancing to a 9-man final.

The actual competition format within pools is not entirely clear. No results are known beyond the rankings.

Schedule

Results

Quarterfinals

In the quarterfinals, the fencers were divided into 9 pools of 6 fencers each, with the top two advancing from each pool to the semifinal. The first round was held on 11 and 12 June.

Quarterfinal A

Quarterfinal B

Quarterfinal C

Quarterfinal D

Quarterfinal E

Quarterfinal F

Quarterfinal G

Quarterfinal H

Quarterfinal I

Semifinals

The semifinals were held on 13 June. 3 pools with 6 fencers each competed in round-robin format, with the top 3 fencers in each pool advancing.

Semifinal A

Semifinal B

Semifinal C

Final

The final was conducted on 14 June.

Results summary

References

Fencing at the 1900 Summer Olympics